Molly McButter is an American-made flavored butter substitute manufactured by B&G Foods.  Originally developed by food chemists at Alberto-Culver it is a lower-calorie replacement for butter.

The ingredients listed for the Molly McButter Natural Butter Flavor Sprinkles include natural butter flavor, butter, buttermilk, and partially hydrogenated soybean oil. As a result of its partially hydrogenated oil ingredient, Molly McButter contains trans fat.

In a 1989 evaluation by Consumer Reports, food scientists and taste-testers found that Molly McButter had a butter-like flavor with slight dairy notes, but also had a chemical taste and was notably saltier than butter. The study also revealed that Molly McButter was significantly more expensive than butter, and had the highest sodium content among the butter substitutes tested, with nearly three times more than one of its competitors.

As of 1990, Molly McButter was available in butter, cheese, and sour cream flavors. For each flavor, a half-teaspoon serving—described by the manufacturer as equivalent to three tablespoons of butter—contains four calories compared to the almost 20 calories in a half-teaspoon of butter, but also contains 90 milligrams of sodium. The products can be sprinkled over cooked foods such as rice or vegetables, or used in recipes to replace butter, cheese or sour cream.

In 1993, The Ladies' Home Journal ran a contest in which readers submitted recipes they had created using Molly McButter, with the winner to receive a new kitchen appliance and a cash award.

By 2009, Molly McButter and Mrs. Dash Seasoning Blends (also owned by B&G) worked with the Idaho Potato Commission, an agency of the state of Idaho, to promote retail sales of potatoes to consumers. The partnership sponsored an Idaho Potato Retail Display Contest, scheduled to coincide with Potato Lovers Month, in which retailers competed for prizes including a cash award.

See also
 Butter salt
 Popcorn seasoning

References

Butter
Foods featuring butter